Walerian Kisieliński (1 March 1907, in Brzezinka – 19 February 1988, in Warsaw) was a Polish footballer who played as a forward. He was capped seven times for the Poland national team between 1931 and 1937, scoring 2 goals. He was also part of Poland's squad for the 1936 Summer Olympics.

Kisieliński played in several teams, after starting his career in Soła Oświęcim, he moved among others to Fablok Chrzanów (1926–1930), then Wisła Kraków (1930–1932), Cracovia (1932–1935) finally  to settle in Warsaw, to play for Polonia Warsaw (1936–1939, 1945). He was twice champion of Poland with Wisła Kraków (1927 and 1928), also in 1931 was the top scorer of the Polish Football League.

References

1907 births
1988 deaths
People from Oświęcim County
Sportspeople from Lesser Poland Voivodeship
Association football forwards
Polish footballers
Poland international footballers
Olympic footballers of Poland
Footballers at the 1936 Summer Olympics
Wisła Kraków players
MKS Cracovia (football) players
Polonia Warsaw players
Ekstraklasa players
Polish Austro-Hungarians